The Phyllotopsidaceae are a family of fungi in the order Agaricales. Basidiocarps are either clavarioid and simple (in the genus Macrotyphula) or agaricoid and clustered on wood. The family was established as a result of molecular research, based on cladistic analysis of DNA sequences.

See also
List of Agaricales families

References

Agaricales families
Agaricales